Our Forbidden Places (original French title:Nos lieux interdits) is a 2008 documentary film.

Synopsis 
In 2004, the King of Morocco launched an Equity and Reconciliation Commission to investigate state violence during the Years of Lead. For three years, the film follows four families in their search for the truth: Activist, young rebel soldier or simple citizen, either they or their relations were imprisoned in different parts of Morocco. Each person tries to "find out", discover a "reason", to be able to mourn. But forty years later, the state secret finally unveils the existence of another, more intimate secret, the family secret. They all feel the need to reconstruct history and recover their parents, taken from them twice over, once by their disappearance and another by the secret. Choosing between deeply set silences, lies and taboos within and outside the families, over forty years.

Awards 
 Fespaco 2009

References

External links

2008 films
French documentary films
Moroccan documentary films
2008 documentary films
Documentary films about reconciliation
Documentary films about families
Human rights in Morocco
Documentary films about African politics
2000s French films